Sheffield Township is one of the twenty-seven townships of Ashtabula County, Ohio, United States. The 2010 census found 1,639 people in the township.

Geography
Located in the northeastern part of the county, it borders the following townships:
Kingsville Township - north
Monroe Township - east
Pierpont Township - southeast corner
Denmark Township - south
Jefferson Township - southwest corner
Plymouth Township - west

No municipalities are located in Sheffield Township.

Name and history
Statewide, the only other Sheffield Township is located in Lorain County.

The first settlers in Sheffield Township were John Shaw, a former British soldier, and his wife, who came in 1812. When the township was organized in 1817 – 1820, John Griggs, first Justice of the Peace, changed the name to Sheffield, meaning "sheaf of fields", when it was disconnected from Kingsville Township in 1820. Prior to that time that portion of Kingsville Township had been called East Matherstown, to distinguish it from Matherstown, a name by which Saybrook Township was at one time known.

Government
The township is governed by a three-member board of trustees, who are elected in November of odd-numbered years to a four-year term beginning on the following January 1. Two are elected in the year after the presidential election and one is elected in the year before it. There is also an elected township fiscal officer, who serves a four-year term beginning on April 1 of the year after the election, which is held in November of the year before the presidential election. Vacancies in the fiscal officership or on the board of trustees are filled by the remaining trustees.  The current members of the board are Alan Kohta, Troy Vanek, and Ken Kister.

References

External links
Township website
County website

Townships in Ashtabula County, Ohio
Townships in Ohio